The following are the national records in athletics in the autonomous State of Palestine maintained by the Palestine Athletic Federation (PAF).

Outdoor

Key to tables:

+ = en route to a longer distance

h = hand timing

Men

Women

Indoor

Men

Women

Notes

References

External links
PAF web site 

Palestine
Records
Athletics